Cris E. Dush is an American politician.  A Republican, he has been a member of the Pennsylvania State Senate since 2020, elected from the 25th District. From 2014 to 2020, Dush was a member of the Pennsylvania House of Representatives, elected from the 66th House district, which then encompassed Jefferson County and Indiana County.

Education and career before politics
Dush graduated from Brookville Area High School in 1979. He was a member of the U.S. Air Force from 1982 to 1990 and a member of the Pennsylvania Air National Guard from 2000 to 2016. From 1995 until his retirement in January 2012, Dush was employed by the Pennsylvania Department of Corrections as a prison corrections officer.

Political career

Pennsylvania House of Representatives 
Dush was elected to the Pennsylvania House of Representatives in 2014, representing the 66th district. In March 2018, Dush introduced resolutions, co-sponsored by 12 other Republicans state legislators, to impeach four Pennsylvania Supreme Court justices in response to the court's decision in League of Women Voters v. Commonwealth that struck down a Republican-drawn Pennsylvania congressional district map as a partisan gerrymander that violated the state constitution's requirement of "free and equal" elections. Dush made this proposal after the U.S. Supreme Court rejected a request from Republican legislative leaders in Pennsylvania to block the redrawn congressional map. Dush asserted that the justices' decision constituted "misbehavior in office" and was a judicial infringement on legislative power. The attempt to impeach the justices was denounced by Chief Justice Thomas Saylor, and failed after House Republican Leader David L. Reed decided not to support it.

Pennsylvania State Senate 
In November 2019, Dush announced he would not seek a fourth term in the Pennsylvania House of Representatives, noting a promise he made to only serve three terms when he was first elected in 2014. In January 2020, Dush said he would seek the Republican nomination for Pennsylvania Auditor General, joining a race against two other Republicans seeking the nomination. The next month, however, Dush left that race and announced that he would run for the state Senate instead, for the 25th district seat left open by the retirement of Joe Scarnati. Dush won the race for the seat against Democrat Margie Brown.

In September 2021, Dush chaired a Republican-led committee that approved subpoenas for a wide range of data and personal information on voters.

In 2022, he sponsored legislation to prohibit ballot drop boxes in Pennsylvania elections.

Dush was appointed to chair of the Senate State Government Committee in 2023 by President pro tempore Kim Ward. In that role Dush approved of measures to require voter ID, allow for post-election audits, and require more security for ballot drop boxes.

Political positions

Marijuana 
Dush opposed proposals by Democratic Lieutenant Governor John Fetterman to legalize the adult use of marijuana in Pennsylvania.

COVID-19 
In 2020, Dush compared Governor Tom Wolf's handling of the COVID-19 pandemic in Pennsylvania to Nazi Germany. A group of Jewish organizations, including the Philadelphia branch of the Anti-Defamation League and the Jewish Federation of Greater Pittsburgh, condemned Dush's Nazi analogy as "offensive and wrong".

2020 election and continuing denial
After the 2020 U.S. presidential election, Dush was one of 26 Pennsylvania House Republicans who called for withdrawing certification of presidential electors, despite Joe Biden winning Pennsylvania by over 80,000 votes with no evidence of fraud. This was also after federal appeals brought by the Trump campaign were dismissed due to lack of evidence. Afterward, Dush traveled to Arizona along with fellow senator Doug Mastriano, and state house member Rob Kauffman, to observe its 2021 Maricopa County presidential ballot audit, which the Maricopa County Board of Supervisors called a "spectacle". The audit was ordered by Arizona's Republican senate majority, the rationale for which was generated by widely discredited conspiracy theories. One firm involved had previously audited the 2020 election in Pennsylvania. The United States Department of Justice warned the audit participants that they may have broken the law in compromising the integrity of those Maricopa County, Arizona ballots. Dush supported efforts for a similar audit to take place in Pennsylvania.

References

External links
Official campaign website
Official Pennsylvania State Senate profile

|-

Living people
Republican Party members of the Pennsylvania House of Representatives
Place of birth missing (living people)
21st-century American politicians
1961 births
Republican Party Pennsylvania state senators
Politicians from Jefferson County, Pennsylvania